The Turkish Cypriot Community Awards was launched in 2018. It recognises the impact that members of the Turkish Cypriot charity sector have made in the United Kingdom. The awards are voted for by members of the community and presented by dignitaries at an event gala including Tufan Erhürman Prime Minister of Northern Cyprus. The first awards event were presented in 2019. In 2020, due to the outbreak of COVID-19 the Turkish Cypriot Community Awards did not proceed beyond nominations.

Winners and nominees

2019 Winners and nominees

2020 nominees

References

External links
 Official website

2019 in London
Turkish awards
Cypriot awards